Ronnie de Guzman Liang is a Filipino multi-hyphenate personality known for his work in music, acting, modeling, and social media influencing. He is also an Army Reservist and a licensed private pilot.

Liang is currently pursuing his commercial pilot and instructor pilot training at the Pilipinas Space and Aviation Academy Incorporated. He holds a Master's Degree in Management, major in National Security and Administration from the Philippine Christian University.
Liang gained widespread recognition as a finalist in the popular reality-talent search franchise in the Philippines, Pinoy Dream Academy. He was the second runner-up next to Jay-R Siaboc and grand star dreamer Yeng Constantino. He sang the popular OPM hit "Ngiti" and was once a mainstay of ABS-CBN's Sunday variety show ASAP 08.

He also served as one of the "JukeBosses"/Judges of TV5's Sing Galing.

In 2022, Liang founded the Ronnie Liang Project Ngiti Foundation, Inc. with the aim of providing assistance to people, particularly children, with cleft lip and cleft palate.

With his various accomplishments in different fields, Ronnie Liang has become an inspiration to many Filipinos.

Biography
Liang is the youngest of the seven children of a low-income family. He supported himself through college by working in a fast food outlet and a video shop, while studying at Holy Angel University in his hometown of Angeles, Pampanga. He graduated with a BS Education degree (physics, chemistry and biology major).

Career
Liang started working part-time as a ramp model, until his manager discovered that Ronnie could sing and encouraged him to join singing contests. Among them was Pinoy Pop Superstar.

Liang then joined Pinoy Dream Academy and made it past the initial screening to be one of the 20 scholars to study inside the academy. After a few months, Ronnie made it to the Honor's List of Six and ended up as PDA's second runner-up.

Liang now is being managed by Viva Artist Agency.

Liang's wholesome brand personality and image stand out because of his talent, admirable spirit, and dedication for 16 years in the entertainment industry.

Liang serves as role model due to his involvement in numerous humanitarian activities and public service, as follows:

·      1st Lieutenant of the Philippine Army, Reserve Command

·      Ambassador of Department of Education (DEPED)- Brigada Iskwela

·      Ambassador of Civil Aviation Authority of the Philippines (CAAP)

·      Ambassador of Civil Aeronautics Board (CAB)

·      Ambassador of People’s Law and Enforcement Board (PLEB)

·      Ambassador of Operation Smile

·      Ambassador of Philippine Christian University

·      Member of Advisory Group of Philippine National Police Integrity Monitoring and Enforcement Group (PNP-IMEG)

·      Ambassador of UNICEF for Global Hand washing

·      Ambassador of ARMM for Global Hand washing

·      Member of the Rotary Club of Pasig Premier

·      RedCross Donor

Various media outlets described Liang as a man who wears many hats, a multi-hyphenate person, a Pop Balladeer, and an OPM Heartthrob.

Filmography

Television

Film

Discography

Solo albums

Singles

Music videos
"Ngiti"
"Gusto Kita" (original Indonesian pop song by the late Indonesian pop jazz singer Utha Likumahuwa in 1987, later translated into a Tagalog song by Gino Padilla in 1991, also covered by Angeline Quinto)
"Ikaw"
"Akala Mo"
"May Minamahal" (original by Hajji Alejandro)
"Beginning Today"
"Oh Holy Night"
"Liwanag"
"Hiling"
"Miss Kita Kung Christmas" (original by the late Susan Fuentes) 
"Looking Through the Eyes of Love"
"Tila"
"Ligaya"
"Yakap"
”Para Sa Bayan”

Concerts
 PDA Top 6 Dream Concert Tour: January 2007
 PDA Top 6 Dream Concert World Tour: April 2007
 US Tour: July – August 2007
 "Triple Dare Music" – September 27 at the Music Museum
LoveXRomance – November 8, 2019 at the Music Museum | Special Guests: Sarah Geronimo, Ella Cruz and Janine Teñoso
 LoveXRomance-Dinner for a Cause - February 11, 2023 at Solano Hotel in Lipa, Batangas | Special Guests: Queenay, Carmela Lorzano and Janette Mamino

Awards and nominations

Trivia

Ronnie Liangs cover song "Gusto Kita" is actual a translation song originally an Indonesian song as "Sesaat Kau Hadir" by the late Indonesian pop singer Utha Likumahuwa was released in 1987. Four years later, it was translated into a Tagalog song by OPM pop singer Gino Padilla and later also covered by Ronnie Liang in 2007.
Ronnie Liang is also a pilot aside his singing and acting.
Ronnie Liang's song "Ngiti" was also covered by Tito, Vic & Joey during their performance at the "Sa Tamang Panahon: ALDub Grand Fans Day TV Special" was featured on Eat Bulaga on GMA Channel 7 in 2015.
Ronnie Liang is one of the Board Members of the People's Law Enforcement Board (PLEB) in Quezon City (QC), hearing citizen's complaints against policemen in  QC.

See also
 Pinoy Dream Academy
 ABS-CBN

References

External links
Liang's official site
Liang's official forums

21st-century Filipino male singers
Living people
People from Quezon City
Filipino people of half-Chinese descent
People from Angeles City
Kapampangan people
Singers from Pampanga
People from Rizal
Filipino Protestants
Pinoy Dream Academy participants
Star Magic
Viva Artists Agency
Viva Records (Philippines) artists
Year of birth missing (living people)